KLZK-FM (107.7 MHz, "107.7 YES! FM") is a radio station licensed to Idalou, Texas and serving the Lubbock, Texas area. KLZK is owned by Ramar Communications Inc. Its studios and transmitter are co-located in south Lubbock.

HD formats
On October 20, 2021, KLZK-FM (formerly KLBB-FM) has launched and added a Rhythmic Contemporary format on its HD2 sub channel, feeding FM translator 92.3 FM MHz (K222CQ), branded as "92.3 The Vibe". The Slogan is also known as "Lubbock's Real Hip Hop & R&B".

FM translator
KSSL 107.3 FM MHz is still continuing to broadcast on KLZK HD4 sub channel, on FM translator (K231BE) 94.1 FM MHz.

References

External links
Ramar Communications Website
KLZK's website

LZK-FM
Radio stations established in 2012
2012 establishments in Texas
Hot adult contemporary radio stations in the United States